Moira Lynd (1903-1984) was a British stage, television and film actress. During the 1930s she became a leading lady in British quota quickies. She made her last film in 1940, but made several television appearances in the post-war era.

Filmography
 The Perfect Lady (1931)
 Verdict of the Sea (1932)
 The Strangler (1932)
 Illegal (1932)
 Going Straight (1933)
 Swinging the Lead (1934)
 The Right Age to Marry (1935)
 Vanity (1935)
 The Village Squire (1935)
 Luck of the Turf (1936)
 Full Speed Ahead (1936)
 Nothing Like Publicity (1936)
 All That Glitters (1937)
 The Spider (1940)

Bibliography
 Chibnall, Steve. Quota Quickies: The Birth of the British 'B' film. British Film Institute, 2007.

External links

1903 births
Year of death missing
Scottish film actresses
Scottish stage actresses
Scottish television actresses
Actresses from Edinburgh